Claude Charles Goureau (15 April 1790, Pisy, Yonne – 6 February 1879, Santigny) was a French soldier and entomologist.

In 1808, he entered L'École Polytechnique, training there until 1810. He was in command of various fortifications, not only those of Paris in 1840, but also forts guarding the English Channel at Mayenne and Ille-et-Vilaine. In 1846, he became an Officer of the Legion of Honour.

After his retirement, in 1850, to Santigny, he became fully occupied with entomology. Goureau was especially devoted to the study of harmful (and later beneficial) insects. He became a member of the Société entomologique de France in 1835, becoming vice-president in 1842, 1844 and 1851, president in 1845 and 1852 and an honorary member in 1866. He is credited as being the first to recognize structural colors in the seemingly clear transparent wings of Drosophilidae in 1843.

Works
Partial list

Les Insectes nuisibles aux arbres fruitiers, aux plantes potagères, aux céréales et aux plantes fourragères (two volumes, V. Masson et fils, Paris, 1861-1865).
Les Insectes nuisibles à l'homme, aux animaux et à l'économie domestiques (V. Masson et fils, Paris, 1866).
Les Insectes nuisibles aux forêts et aux arbres d'avenues (V. Masson et fils, Paris, 1867).
Les Insectes nuisibles aux arbustes et aux plantes de parterre (V. Masson et fils, Paris, 1869).
Les insectes utiles à l'homme (V. Masson et fils, Paris, 1872).

Sources

Jean Gouillard (2004). Histoire des entomologistes français, 1750-1950. Édition entièrement revue et augmentée. Boubée (Paris) : 287 p.
French Wikipedia Translation

References 

French entomologists
French soldiers
1790 births
1879 deaths
19th-century French zoologists
People from Yonne
Presidents of the Société entomologique de France
École Polytechnique alumni